This is an index of Welsh peers and baronets whose primary peerage, life peerage, and baronetcy titles include a Welsh place-name origin or its territorial qualification is within the historic counties of Wales.

Welsh-titled peers derive their titles from a variety of sources. After Llywelyn ap Gruffudd of the House of Aberffraw, the last Welsh Prince of Wales, was killed during the Edwardian Conquest in 1282, the Principality of Wales was divided into English-style counties. Many of the former native titles were abolished, but some of the native Welsh lords were given English titles in exchange for their loyalty. Welsh Law remained in force in the Principality for civil cases, including for inheritance. However, Edward I did reform Welsh succession to introduce male preference primogeniture, a reform which facilitated the inheritance by English marcher lords of Welsh lands.

With the Laws in Wales Acts 1535-1542, Wales was formally annexed by England, with the full implementation of English Common Law for civil cases. Both native Welsh and Marcher lordships were fully incorporated into the English Peerage. Eventually, succeeding peerage divisions emerged. Wales does not have a separate peerage, but Welsh peers are included in the English, Great Britain, and finally the United Kingdom peerages. In 1793 the title "Earl of the Town and County of Carnarvon in the Principality of Wales" was created, the only mention of the "Principality of Wales" in a title. After the deposition by the English parliament in February 1689 of King James II and VII from the thrones of England and Ireland (the Scottish Estates followed suit on 11 April 1689), he and his successors continued to create peers and baronets, which became known as the Jacobite Peerage.

Some lords, the Earl Lloyd-George of Dwyfor, and the Marquess of Anglesey, make their principal seat within Wales, while others, such as the Marquess of Abergavenny have their seat outside Wales.

Titles as rendered in the Welsh language 

 *When referencing continental titles of Earl rankings.

Royal titles 

See also Honours of the Principality of Wales

Ducal titles 

Currently there are no Welsh ducal titles.

Marquessate titles

Earldom titles

Viscountcy titles

Barony titles

Welsh life peers

Territorial qualification within Wales

This is an index of Welsh life peers whose primary territorial qualification is within the historic counties of Wales. Some may have subsidiary titles outside Wales.

Territorial qualification outside Wales

This is a list of Welsh life peers whose territorial qualification is outside Wales, with no qualification within Wales.

Baronetcy titles 

A baronet (traditional abbreviation Bart, modern abbreviation Bt) or the rare female equivalent, a baronetess (abbreviation Btss), is the holder of a hereditary title awarded by the British Crown known as a baronetcy.

The name baronet is a diminutive of the peerage title baron. The rank of a baronet is between that of a baron and a knight; it has never entitled the bearer to a seat in the House of Lords, but it is hereditary.

See also
List of family seats of Welsh nobility
British nobility
Peerage, an exposition of great detail
Peerage of England
Peerage of Scotland
Peerage of Ireland
History of the Peerage
Gentry
Landed gentry
Forms of address in the United Kingdom
British Honours System

Footnotes

Peers
History of Wales
Wales
Welsh noble families
Peerages in the United Kingdom
Wales
European peerage
Peers of Great Britain
Peers of the United Kingdom